Bisheshwor Prasad Koirala's Atmabrittanta (Late Life Recollections) is the autobiography of a prominent political figure and the first democratically elected Prime Minister of Nepal. In the book, Koirala recounts his early life in India, the development of his political career and the founding of the  Nepali Congress National Party, armed revolution against the Rana Dynasty, involvement with the early governments of Nepal, struggles with the monarchy, and his jailed life.
.

References 

2001 non-fiction books
Books about Nepal
Nepalese biographies
Nepalese books
Nepalese non-fiction literature
Works by Bishweshwar Prasad Koirala